The Sarkaria Commission was set up in 1983 by the central government of India. The Sarkaria Commission's charter was to examine the central-state relationship on various portfolios and suggest changes within the framework of Constitution of India.
 The Commission was so named as it was headed by Justice Ranjit Singh Sarkaria (Chairman of the commission), a retired judge of the Supreme Court of India. The other members of the committee were Shri B. Sivaraman (Cabinet Secretary), Dr S.R. Sen (former Executive Director of IBRD) and Rama Subramaniam (Member Secretary).

Recommendations 
The final report contained 247 specific recommendations. In spite of the large size of its reports - the Commission recommended, by and large, status quo in the Centre-State relations, especially in the areas, relating to legislative matters, role of Governors and use of Article 356.

It is widely accepted that to whatever extent the Commission suggested change, the recommendations were not implemented by the government.

The report contains 247 recommendations spreading over the following 19 Chapters.

 Chapter 0. It gave suggestions like the centre should consult state before legislation on concurrent list, river water dispute tribunal award should be binding on parties three months after the award is given by tribunal, and centre should make deliberate use of article 258.
 Chapter I. Perspective
 Chapter II. Legislative Relations
 Chapter III. Administrative Relations
 Chapter IV. Role of the Governor
 Chapter V. Reservation of Bills by Governors for President's consideration and Promulgation of Ordinances
 Chapter VI. Emergency Provisions
 Chapter VII. Deployment of Union Armed Forces in States for Public Order Duties
 Chapter VIII. All India Services
 Chapter IX. Inter-Governmental Council
 Chapter X. Financial Relations
 Chapter XI. Economic and Social Planning
 Chapter XII. Industries
 Chapter XIII. Mines and Minerals
 Chapter XIV. Agriculture
 Chapter XV. Forests
 Chapter XVI. Food and Civil Supplies
 Chapter XVII. Inter-State River Water Disputes
 Chapter XVIII. Trade, Commerce and Inter-course within the Territory of India
 Chapter XIX. Mass Media
 Chapter XX. Miscellaneous Matters
 Chapter XXI. General Observations
 Chapter XXII. Appendices
 Chapter XXIII Conclusion

Recommendations on Appointment of Governor :

 should be an eminent person;
 must be a person from outside the State;
 not have participated in active politics at least for some time before his appointment;
 he should be a detached person and not too intimately connected with the local politics of the State;
 he should be appointed in consultation with the Chief Minister of the State, Vice-President of India and the Speaker of the Lok Sabha;
 His tenure of office must be guaranteed and should not be disturbed except for extremely compelling reasons and if any action is to be taken against him he must be given a reasonable opportunity for showing cause against the grounds on which he is sought to be removed. In case of such termination or resignation of the Governor, the Government should lay before both the Houses of Parliament a statement explaining the circumstances leading to such removal or resignation, as the case may be;
 After demitting his office, the person appointed as Governor should not be eligible for any other appointment or office of profit under the Union or a State Government except for a second term as Governor or election as Vice-President or President of India, as the case may be; and
 At the end of his tenure, reasonable post-retirement benefits should be provided.

The Commission felt that the State Government should be given prominence in appointing the Governor. The appointment should be made

 From a panel to be prepared by the State Legislature; or
 From a panel to be prepared by the State Government or invariably by the Chief Minister;

The commission felt that the chief minister should be consulted before appointing the governor. For proper working of the parliamentary system, there has to be a personal rapport between the governor and the chief minister. Thus the main purpose of consulting the chief minister is to ascertain his objections, if any, to the proposed appointment. The commission found that consultation with the chief minister has not invariably been taking place in recent years. The general practice, as far as the commission has been able to ascertain, seems to be that the Union Government merely informs the chief minister that a certain person is being appointed as the governor of the state. Sometimes even such prior intimation is not given. The commission recommended that the Vice President of India and the Speaker of the Lok Sabha should be consulted by the prime minister in the selection of governor. Such consultation, the commission felt, will greatly enhance the credibility of the selection process.

Some of the recommendations have been adopted such as governor to be from outside the state. The SC has many times emphasized the urgent need for implementing Sarkaria commission's recommendations on selection and appointment of governors.

See also 
Sarkaria commission report

References 

Indian commissions and inquiries
Federalism in India